Berlin Center may refer to the following places in the United States:

 Berlin Center, Michigan in Ionia County
 Berlin Center, Ohio in Mahoning County

See also
 Mitte, the center of Berlin, Germany